Hog Wild is a 1930 American pre-Code Laurel and Hardy film, directed by James Parrott.

Plot
Ollie can't find his hat and accuses his wife of losing it. Only when he looks in the mirror does he see it on his head.

Ollie wants to join Stan for an afternoon of fun, but his wife has other ideas. She demands he install the radio antenna atop their roof, a job he has been neglecting for three months.

Stan drives up and offers to help Ollie. After destroying Hardy's chimney and falling from the roof several times, they perch a ladder in the back seat of Stan's car. The car shifts into gear, and speeds uncontrollably through the city streets with Ollie still perched precariously atop the ladder.

Mrs. Hardy catches up to them on foot after the car is finally stopped, Hardy having been tossed into the street with the ladder. The three attempt to return home while Laurel tries all kinds of noisy things to get the car restarted, including blowing the horn twice. A trolley car approaches them at high speed, and a crowd of onlookers cover their eyes as a loud offscreen crash is heard. The result is the car is squashed like an accordion between the two trolley-cars, and they have to drive home in the mangled car.

Cast
 Stan Laurel as Stan
 Oliver Hardy as Ollie
 Fay Holderness as Mrs. Naomi Hardy
 Dorothy Granger as Tillie, the Hardy's maid

Production notes

Like other Laurel and Hardy films of this period, Hog Wild was refilmed in both Spanish and French versions in which Laurel and Hardy spoke phonetically the respective languages; the part of Mrs. Hardy was recast with, respectively, Linda Loredo and Yola d'Avril. The French version was titled Pele Mele; the Spanish version Radio Mania. In the UK, the film was retitled Aerial Antics, as Hog Wild was an American idiomatic expression. The film is the first to feature a music score throughout. The scoring is experimental and one of the first to use pieces written by Leroy Shield. The Our Gang series was also beginning to use background music but opted to use orchestral scorings initially and began mixing several Shield tunes on the last episode of the 1929-30 season, A Tough Winter.

The short was computer-colorized in 1986.

References

External links
 
 
 
 

1930 films
1930 comedy films
American black-and-white films
Films directed by James Parrott
Laurel and Hardy (film series)
Metro-Goldwyn-Mayer short films
Films with screenplays by H. M. Walker
1930s English-language films
1930s American films